Christian III Maurice, Duke of Saxe-Merseburg (Merseburg, 7 November 1680 – Merseburg, 14 November 1694), was a duke of Saxe-Merseburg and member of the House of Wettin.

He was the eldest son of Christian II, Duke of Saxe-Merseburg, and Erdmuthe Dorothea of Saxe-Zeitz.

Life

At the age of thirteen, Christian Maurice succeeded his father upon his death on 20 October 1694. During his minority, the Elector Frederick August I of Saxony took over the administration of the duchy as regent. However, the custody of the young duke was mainly the responsibility of his mother, the dowager duchess Erdmuthe Dorothea, who also took an interest in governing the duchy.

The new duke died of smallpox after reigned for only twenty-five days and was succeeded by his younger brother Maurice Wilhelm.

References 
 Heinrich Theodor Flathe: Christian II. (Herzog von Sachsen-Merseburg). In: Allgemeine Deutsche Biographie (ADB). Band 4, Duncker & Humblot, Leipzig 1876, S. 175.
 Johann Sebastian Müller, Der Chur- und fürstlichen Häuser Sachsen, Ernestin- und Albertinischer Linie Annales von 1400–1700, Leipzig 1701, Tafel XIII

1680 births
1694 deaths
House of Saxe-Merseburg
Dukes of Saxe-Merseburg
Albertine branch
Monarchs who died as children